Lembodes is a genus of hidden snout weevils in the beetle family Curculionidae. There are about eight described species in Lembodes.

Species
These eight species belong to the genus Lembodes:
 Lembodes albosignatus Chevrolat, 1879
 Lembodes arachnipes Chevrolat, 1880
 Lembodes furcicollis Chevrolat, 1879
 Lembodes nocturnus Chevrolat, 1880
 Lembodes solitarius Boheman, 1844
 Lembodes subcostatus Van Dyke, 1953
 Lembodes trux Champion, 1905
 Lembodes ulula Chevrolat, 1879

References

Further reading

 
 
 

Cryptorhynchinae
Articles created by Qbugbot
Taxa named by Carl Johan Schönherr
Taxa described in 1844